Margaret Downey (born August 16, 1950) is a nontheist activist who is a former President of Atheist Alliance International and founder and president of the Freethought Society (formerly Freethought Society of Greater Philadelphia). She also founded the Anti-Discrimination Support Network, which reports and helps deal with discrimination against atheists.

Early life
Downey grew up with a Puerto Rican mother and an Irish father. When her father left, she adopted a family friend "Uncle Floyd" as a father-figure  who encouraged Downey into atheism.

Activism
Downey has been active in a variety of causes including feminism and anti-smoking campaigns before becoming a public representative of atheism.

Margaret Downey is known for her activities in this area. Her first major involvement as a publicly active nontheist was when her son Matthew was not allowed to renew his membership in the Boy Scouts of America since he was raised in a nontheist household. This led to Margaret Downey v. Boy Scouts of America, which did not go far in the courts before the United States Supreme Court's 2000 decision in Boy Scouts of America v. Dale that the Boy Scouts constituted a private organization and could thus choose their own membership criteria, thus preventing Downey from taking her case further. Since then Downey has been a prominent public representative of atheism in the United States as well as representing atheists and other non-theists at United Nations conferences. Her work has been incorporated into United Nations reports on religious discrimination.

Downey is also affiliated with a variety of other organizations that promote atheism and the separation of church and state such as Freedom From Religion Foundation of which she is a board member and the American Humanist Association of which she is a past board member. In 2003 she was one of the signers of the Humanist Manifesto.

See also
 Boy Scouts of America membership controversies
 Discrimination against atheists

References

External links
Freethought Society official website
 with Brian Sapient and Kelly O'Connor of the Rational Response Squad
Dogma Free America podcast interview with Margaret Downey

American atheism activists
Living people
Atheist feminists
Political activists from Pennsylvania
Activists from Philadelphia
People from Baton Rouge, Louisiana
1950 births
American people of Irish descent
American people of Puerto Rican descent
American feminists
20th-century atheists
21st-century atheists